The Tuba is a river in Krasnoyarsk Krai in Siberia in Russia.  It is formed by the confluence of the rivers Kazyr (Казыр) and Amyl (Амы́л) and is a right tributary of the Yenisey.

The Tuba flows into the Krasnoyarsk Reservoir so that the mouth of the Tuba is actually part of the reservoir.

There are two (sometimes considered three) road bridges and a railway bridge constructed over the Tuba.

See also
Хакасско-Минусинская котловина.jpg, a map of the Upper Yenisei and its tributaries including the Tuba

References

External links

Rivers of Krasnoyarsk Krai